Burlin is both a surname and a given name. Notable people with the name include:

Surname
Anatoliy Burlin (born 1990), Ukrainian football midfielder
Dan Burlin (born 1980), Swedish football player
Johan Burlin (born 1989), Swedish ice hockey player
Natalie Curtis Burlin (1875–1921), American ethnomusicologist
Paul Burlin (1886–1969), American painter

Given name
Burlin White (1895–1971), American baseball catcher and manager